Events from the year 1912 in France.

Incumbents
President: Armand Fallières 
President of the Council of Ministers: Joseph Caillaux (until 21 January), Raymond Poincaré (starting 21 January)

Events
13 January – Raymond Poincaré forms a coalition government, beginning his first term of office as Prime Minister on 21 January.

30 March – Treaty of Fez, Sultan Abdelhafid gives up the sovereignty of Morocco, making it a protectorate of France.
10 April –  embarks passengers from tenders at Cherbourg Harbour for the only time.

Arts and literature
Marcel Duchamp paints Nude Descending a Staircase, No. 2.

Sport
26 June – 1912 French Grand Prix, won by Georges Boillot driving a Peugeot.
30 June–28 July – 10th Tour de France, won by Odiel Defraye.

Births

January to March
6 January – Jacques Ellul, philosopher, sociologist, theologian (died 1994)
15 January – Michel Debré, politician and first Prime Minister of the Fifth Republic (died 1996)
18 January – David Rousset, writer and political activist (died 1997)
3 February – Jacques Soustelle, anthropologist (died 1990)
7 February – Alfred Desenclos, composer (died 1971)
7 February – Amédée Fournier, cyclist (died 1992)
11 February – Jacques Corrèze, businessman and politician (died 1991)
12 February – Pierre Jaminet, cyclist (died 1968)
20 February – Pierre Boulle, novelist (died 1994)
28 March – Léon Damas, poet and politician (died 1978)

April to June
12 April – Georges Franju, filmmaker (died 1987)
14 April – Robert Doisneau, photographer (died  1994)
19 April – Raymond Pichard, Dominican priest and television presenter (died 1992)
21 April – Marcel Camus, film director (died 1982)
28 April – Odette Sansom, World War II heroine (died 1995)
16 May – Alfred Aston, international soccer player (died 2003)
23 May – Jean Françaix, composer, pianist, and orchestrator (died 1997)
29 May – Pierre-Paul Schweitzer, fourth managing director of the International Monetary Fund (died 1994)
30 May – Roger Courtois, international soccer player (died 1972)
8 June – Roger Michelot, boxer (died 1993)
15 June – Alix Combelle, swing jazz tenor saxophonist, clarinetist and bandleader (died 1978)
29 June – Lucie Aubrac, World War II Resistance fighter (died 2007)
29 June – Émile Peynaud, oenologist and researcher (died 2004)

July to December
18 July – Max Rousié, rugby league and rugby union footballer (died 1959)
5 August – Abbé Pierre, priest and founder of Emmaus movement (died 2007)
26 August – Léo Marjane, born Thérèse Maria Léonie Gendebien, popular singer (died 2016)
8 September – Marie-Dominique Philippe, Dominican philosopher and theologian (died 2006)
14 September – Jean Lescure, poet (died 2005)
3 November – Marie-Claude Vaillant-Couturier, member of the French Resistance (died 1996)
13 November – Claude Pompidou, philanthropist, wife of President of France Georges Pompidou (died 2007)
21 November – Pierre Grimal, historian and classicist (died 1996)

Full date unknown
Gérard Albouy, milliner (died 1985)
Paul Petard, botanist (died 1980)

Deaths
16 January – Alfred Jules Émile Fouillée, philosopher (born 1838)
14 April – Henri Brisson, statesman and Prime minister of France (born 1835)
12 June – Frédéric Passy, economist, joint winner (with Henry Dunant) of first Nobel Peace Prize, 1901 (born 1822)
16 June – Henri Jean Baptiste Anatole Leroy-Beaulieu, publicist and historian (born 1842)
17 July – Henri Poincaré, mathematician, theoretical physicist and philosopher of science (born 1854)
12 September – Pierre-Hector Coullié, Archbishop of Lyon (born 1829)

Full date unknown
Magloire-Désiré Barthet, Vicar Apostolic of Senegambia (born 1832)
Félicien Henry Caignart de Saulcy, entomologist (born 1832)

See also
 List of French films of 1912

References

1910s in France